The Bolton Wanderers F.C. Player of the Year is an award presented to the Bolton Wanderers fans' player of the season.

The first winner of the award was Simon Charlton in 2002. Since then, thirteen more players have won the award with one player, Kevin Davies, winning the award three times and another, Tim Ream, winning it twice. Davies was the only player to retain the trophy, winning it in 2008 and 2009 until Ream retained it himself in 2014 and 2015.

Voting takes place towards the end of each season, usually in April, and is open to anyone. Fans can click on a link on the Bolton Wanderers website.

Winners

Players in bold are still playing for Bolton Wanderers.

Wins by player

Wins by playing position

Wins by nationality

References

Player Of The Year
Association football player of the year awards by club in England
Association football player non-biographical articles